Vidyanagar College, established in 1963, is an undergraduate college in Vidyanagar,Bara Gagan Gohalia, South 24 Parganas district, West Bengal, India. It is affiliated with the University of Calcutta.

Departments

Science
Chemistry
Physics
Mathematics
Botany
Zoology

Arts and Commerce
Bengali
English
History
Political Science
Philosophy
Education
Commerce

Accreditation
Vidyanagar College is recognized by the University Grants Commission (UGC).

Notable faculty
Pranab Mukherjee, President of India

See also 
List of colleges affiliated to the University of Calcutta
Education in India
Education in West Bengal

References

External links
Vidyanagar College

Educational institutions established in 1963
University of Calcutta affiliates
Universities and colleges in South 24 Parganas district
1963 establishments in West Bengal